Varo Venturi-Clementini (born 9 August 1956, Rome, Italy) is an Italian film director and musician.

Filmography
2013 – Realscienza (Documentary 
2012 – Day 6
2011 – 6 giorni sulla Terra (6 Days on Earth) 
Selected at the 33° Moscow International Film Festival 2011 – Awarded for Best Director at the 2012 CinemAvola Film Festival.
2007 – Nazareno
2002 – L'italiano
2000 – Controvento
1999 – Sotto la luna 
1998 – Don Giovanni 
1997 – Cosmos Hotel

References

External links
 
 Official website

Italian film directors
Living people
1956 births
20th-century Italian male actors
21st-century Italian male actors